Finsterer is a surname. Notable people with the surname include:

Hans Finsterer (1877–1955), Austrian surgeon
Jack Finsterer, Australian actor
Mary Finsterer, Australian composer and academic
Rudolf Finsterer, German rugby player

See also
Hofmeister-Finsterer operation